Generation X is a television pilot directed by Jack Sholder that aired on Fox on February 20, 1996. It was later broadcast as a television film. It is based on the Marvel comic book series of the same name, a spin-off of the X-Men franchise. It was produced by New World Entertainment and Marvel Entertainment Group.

Plot
Rebellious teenager Jubilation Lee (Heather McComb) finds herself in trouble after her mutant "fireworks" power manifests itself at a local arcade. She is rescued from her predicament by Emma Frost (Finola Hughes) and Sean Cassidy (Jeremy Ratchford), the headmasters of Xavier's School for Gifted Youngsters. They recruit "Jubilee" and offer her sanctuary at the school, a place where mutants learn to control their powers. The trio then picks up teenager Angelo "Skin" Espinosa (Agustin Rodriguez) and proceed to the school where Jubilee and Skin are introduced to their fellow students; M (Amarilis), Mondo (Bumper Robinson), Buff (Suzanne Davis) and Refrax (Randall Slavin). At the school the students are taught not only to cope with their mutant powers but also with a world that fears and hates them. The students are warned not to leave the school grounds lest they come into conflict with the "townies" from the local area.

In addition to coping with their new abilities, Jubilee and Skin find their dreams haunted by Russel Tresh (Matt Frewer), a mad scientist obsessed with the power of dreams. Tresh once worked with Emma Frost as a researcher on a project to develop a "dream machine" to access the dream dimension but he was fired from the team when Emma discovered his unethical behavior. Tresh believes that material extracted from mutants' brains will allow him to develop his own psychic abilities. Although Jubilee is able to resist Tresh somewhat, Skin finds himself drawn to Tresh and his promises, and unknowingly falls victim to the scientist. Instructors Frost and Cassidy soon find themselves leading the novice team against an enhanced Tresh in order to rescue the enthralled Skin - a conflict which sees the youngsters pull together as a team and leaves a catatonic Tresh trapped in the "dream dimension".

Movie prologue
The following is a prologue quote that appeared at the beginning of the film, which was later emulated in the X-Men theatrical films with similar defining quotes on mutation and evolution, respectively, albeit in voice-over rather than on-screen text:

Cast
 Finola Hughes as Emma Frost / White Queen: She runs the Xavier's School for Gifted Youngsters with Banshee. She takes her job very seriously and wants to make sure that the students are sufficiently trained for any situation. Part of the reason for this may be because in her past she trained another group called the Hellions who were lost, something she blames herself for. Her powers include mind control.
 Jeremy Ratchford as Sean Cassidy / Banshee, an Irish mutant, runs the Xavier's School for Gifted Youngsters with Emma Frost. Sean is much more laid-back in his teaching approach than Emma and wants to make sure that the students bond as a team. He can produce a sonic scream that can stun people.
 Amarilis as Monet Yvette Clarisse Maria Therese St. Croix / M, one of the students at the Xavier's School for Gifted Youngsters, she  claims that she is the perfect mutant; super intelligent, enhanced physical abilities and "level eight invulnerability".
 Heather McComb as Jubilation Lee / Jubilee, the newest student at the Xavier's School for Gifted Youngsters, she is highly intelligent, and very curious. She can generate brightly colored bursts of plasma energy which she can fire from her hands. She also seems to have some psychic abilities.
 Bumper Robinson as Mondo, one of the students at the Xavier's School for Gifted Youngsters, he is hot-headed, and gets into fights easily. He has the ability to  take on the properties of any organic or inorganic matter he touches. Consequently, he doesn't like Jell-O.
 Agustin Rodriguez as Angelo Espinosa / Skin: He has skin that can stretch in a variety of different ways, including the ability to wrap himself around objects. He has a younger sister, whom Russel Tresh threatened if Skin didn't obey him. He seems to have some psychic abilities.
 Suzanne Davis as Arlee Hicks / Buff, one of the students at the Xavier's School for Gifted Youngsters, she is a friendly person, whose mutation increases her muscle mass and strength. She is insecure about her new physique and wears loose clothing to cover it up. 
 Randall Slavin as Kurt Pastorius / Refrax, one of the students at the Xavier's School for Gifted Youngsters, his eyes emit radiation giving him X-Ray vision and heat beams. He is a practical joker who has a crush on Buff. He wears special glasses to control his powers and is best friends with Mondo. 
 Matt Frewer as Doctor Russel Tresh, an unethical scientist and researcher who is investigating subliminal and psychic powers. He worked on a project with Emma Frost, who got him fired for his unethical behavior. Following this he put his talents towards the advertising industry where he uses the money to build a machine to access the "dream dimension".

Production

Development
Some changes were made to the characters in the development of this film. Jubilation "Jubilee" Lee, for example, was not portrayed as a character of Asian descent, despite the X-Men comics and broadcast series having portrayed her as Chinese American. Two new characters, Buff and Refrax, were created to replace characters from the comics. Producer Eric Blakeney had wanted to include Chamber but his powers would have been too expensive to produce on the film's budget. Refrax (Kurt Pastorius) was created to replace Chamber, who had his chest and the lower half of his face destroyed when his powers emerged. Buff (Arlee Hicks) was created to replace Husk, who sheds her skin revealing an epidermis of a different composition beneath.

Locations
The mansion used for the Xavier Institute is Hatley Castle, which was also used as Xavier's school in the films X2, X-Men: The Last Stand, X-Men: Days of Future Past, Deadpool, X-Men: Apocalypse and Deadpool 2. It also served as the Luthor family mansion on the television series Smallville and as the Queen family mansion in early seasons of the television series Arrow.

Release
Generation X was broadcast on Fox as part of the Fox Tuesday Night at the Movies on February 20, 1996. Just before the release, the TV special was testing the waters for a series of TV movies instead of a TV series.

References

External links
 
 

X-Men films
1990s American films
1990s science fiction action films
1990s superhero films
1996 films
1996 television films
1990s English-language films
American science fiction action films
American superhero films
Films directed by Jack Sholder
Films scored by J. Peter Robinson
Fox network original films
New World Pictures films
Television pilots not picked up as a series
Live-action films based on Marvel Comics